Devendra Bahadur Roy is an Indian politician.  He was elected to the Lok Sabha, the lower house of the Parliament of India from the Sultanpur, Uttar Pradesh as a member of the Bharatiya Janata Party .

References

External links
 Official biographical sketch in Parliament of India website

1945 births
2009 deaths
India MPs 1996–1997
India MPs 1998–1999
Lok Sabha members from Uttar Pradesh
Bharatiya Janata Party politicians from Uttar Pradesh